Wyaga is a rural locality in the Goondiwindi Region, Queensland, Australia. In the  Wyaga had a population of 94 people.

Geography 
The Gore Highway passes through from east to west.

History 
The locality was named after an early pastoral run in the district, held in the late 1840s by David Perrier and then transferred to J.J.Whitting in 1849.  Wyaga appears on an 1883 Darling Downs map.

In the  Wyaga had a population of 94 people.

Heritage listings
Wyaga has the following heritage-listed sites:

 Millmerran Road: Wyaga Homestead

References 

Goondiwindi Region
Localities in Queensland